The Austrian International or Austrian Open in badminton is an international open held in Austria since 1965. In the initial years they took place later annually every two years, but since 1973 it has been held annually.

Previous winners

Performances by nation 
Updated after the 2022 edition.

References

External links
BWF: 2006 results
BWF: 2007 results

Badminton tournaments in Austria
Recurring sporting events established in 1965